Camp Groce was originally built in 1862 as a training camp for Confederate States Army soldiers from Texas. The camp was located east of Hempstead, Texas along the Houston and Texas Central Railway on a plantation owned by Leonard W. Groce. Beginning in 1863, the camp was used to house Union Army prisoners of war, but by the end of 1864 all the prisoners were repatriated. In April 1865, Texas regiments belonging to Walker's Division marched to Camp Groce where their units disbanded at the end of the war. There are a few Texas Historical Commission markers near Hempstead commemorating sites associated with Camp Groce.

References

American Civil War prison camps
Texas in the American Civil War
1862 establishments in Texas
1865 disestablishments in Texas